Jewels is a three-act ballet created for the New York City Ballet by co-founder and founding choreographer George Balanchine. It premièred on Thursday, 13 April 1967 at the New York State Theater, with sets designed by Peter Harvey and lighting by Ronald Bates.

Jewels has been called the first full-length abstract ballet. It has three related movements: Emeralds, Rubies, and Diamonds (usually separated by intermissions). It can also be seen as three separate ballets, linked by their jewel-colored costumes. Balanchine commented: "The ballet had nothing to do with jewels. The dancers are just dressed like jewels." Each of the three acts features the music of a different composer: Emeralds is set to the music of Gabriel Fauré, Rubies to the music of Igor Stravinsky and Diamonds to music by Pyotr Ilyich Tchaikovsky.

Costumes
The costumes were created by Balanchine's long-time collaborator Barbara Karinska, who created a distinct look for each different act: romantic, calf-length tulle skirts for Emeralds, fabric that flared at the hips of both men and women in Rubies, and the flat, classical tutu of the Imperial Russian Ballet for Diamonds. The costumes were such finely crafted pieces of art in their own right that some of them have been exhibited in museums and in theatre lobbies. Even Claude Arpels of Van Cleef & Arpels, who suggested the idea of a ballet based on gems to the choreographer, was impressed with her attention to finding the finest trim that would accurately represent the true glitter of genuine gemstones. Additionally, Karinska's painstaking work is credited with making the costumes last despite the sweat and strain of dancing in them. Her designs, needlework and choice in fabrics made them both durable and danceable, illustrating that the bodies inside the costumes were deserving of her utmost respect. When questioned about her attention to her almost extravagant detail she replied, "I sew for girls and boys who make my costumes dance; their bodies deserve my clothes."

Music

Emeralds 
 extracts from Gabriel Fauré's Pelléas et Mélisande (1898) and Shylock (1889).
 average length 31 mins.

Rubies 
 Capriccio for Piano and Orchestra (1929) by Igor Stravinsky.
 average length 19 mins.

Diamonds 
 Movements 2, 3, 4 and 5 from Symphony No. 3 in D major (1875) by Pyotr Ilyich Tchaikovsky
 average length 31 mins.

Casts

Original 
At the premiere in Spring 1967, Mimi Paul danced the parts of Sicilienne variation and the Nocturne ("walking") pas de deux in Emeralds. Paul later went on to coach other dancers in the part, including Sara Mearns.

 
 Emeralds

 Violette Verdy
 Mimi Paul
 Sara Leland
 Suki Schorer
 10 additional women

 Conrad Ludlow
 Francisco Moncion
 John Prinz

 
 Rubies

 Patricia McBride
 Patricia Neary

 Edward Villella

  
 8 additional women

 4 additional men

 
 Diamonds

 Suzanne Farrell

 Jacques d'Amboise

  
 4 demi-soloist couples

  
 12 additional women

 12 additional men

Stagings (other than NYCB) 

 1974 Paris Opera Ballet
 1977 Dutch National Ballet
 1980 Les Grands Ballets Canadiens
 1980 Zurich Ballet
 1981 Chicago City Ballet
 1982 Ballett der Deutschen Staatsoper
 1982 Los Angeles Ballet
 1985 Ballet de l'Opera du Rhin
 1985 Royal Danish Ballet
 1986 Boston Ballet
 1986 Pennsylvania Ballet
 1986 Ballet de l'Opera du Rhin
 1986 Dutch National Ballet
 1987 Ballet of Flanders
 1987 The Chautauqua Institution
 1987 San Francisco Ballet
 1987 Texas Ballet
 1988 Ballet du Nord
 1988 Pacific Northwest Ballet
 1988 PACT Ballet
 1988 Boston Ballet
 1988 Royal Danish Ballet
 1989 Louisville Ballet
 1989 Royal Ballet, London
 1990 Ballet de San Juan
 1990 Les Ballets de Monte-Carlo
 1990 Ballet du Nord
 1990 Ballett der Deutschen Staatsoper 
 1990 PACT Ballet
 1990 Paris Opera Ballet
 1991 Ballet Chicago
 1991 Pacific Northwest Ballet
 1991 San Francisco Ballet
 1991 Texas Ballet
 1992 Ballett der Deutschen Oper
 1992 Miami City Ballet
 1992 Miami City Ballet
 1992 Pennsylvania Ballet
 1993 Finnish National Ballet
 1993 Sacramento Ballet
 1993 Ballet du Nord
 1994 La Scala
 1994 Pittsburgh Ballet Theatre
 1994 Louisville Ballet
 1994 Miami City Ballet
 1994 Miami City Ballet
 1994 PACT Ballet
 1994 Texas Ballet
 1995 American Repertory Ballet
 1995 Kansas City Ballet
 1995 Miami City Ballet
 1995 Pacific Northwest Ballet
 1996 Asami Maki Ballet
 1996 Cincinnati Ballet
 1996 Colorado Ballet
 1996 North Carolina Dance Theatre
 1996 Miami City Ballet
 1996 Paris Opera Ballet
 1996 Pennsylvania Ballet
 1996 Texas Ballet
 1997 Ballet Arizona
 1997 Milwaukee Ballet
 1997 Dutch National Ballet
 1997 Miami City Ballet
 1997 Miami City Ballet
 1997 Pittsburgh Ballet Theatre
 1997 Pittsburgh Ballet Theatre
 1997 Pittsburgh Ballet Theatre
 1997 San Francisco Ballet
 1997 Texas Ballet
 1998 Alberta Ballet
 1998 Hartford Ballet
 1998 San Diego Ballet
 1998 Singapore Dance Theatre
 1998 PACT Ballet
 1998 Texas Ballet
 1999 Ballet Austin
 1999 Carolina Ballet
 1999 Mariinsky Ballet
 1999 Cincinnati Ballet
 1999 Paris Opera Ballet
 1999 Pennsylvania Ballet
 1999 Royal Danish Ballet
 1999 Sacramento Ballet
 2000 National Ballet of Canada
 2000 Royal Winnipeg Ballet
 2000 Dutch National Ballet
 2000 Paris Opera Ballet
 2000 Pittsburgh Ballet Theatre
 2001 Ballet National de Marseille
 2001 Ballet NY
 2002 Ballet du Capitole de Toulouse
 2002 Kirov Ballet 
 2002 Paris Opera Ballet
 2002 San Francisco Ballet
 2002 San Francisco Ballet
 2002 San Francisco Ballet
 2002 San Francisco Ballet
 2002 Texas Ballet
 2003 BalletMet
 2003 Oregon Ballet Theatre
 2003 Washington Ballet
 2003 Cincinnati Ballet
 2003 Milwaukee Ballet
 2003 National Ballet of Canada
 2003 Paris Opera Ballet
 2003 Zurich Ballet
 2004 Cape Town City Ballet
 2004 Boston Ballet
 2004 Colorado Ballet
 2004 Finnish National Ballet
 2004 La Scala
 2004 Louisville Ballet
 2004 Paris Opera Ballet
 2004 Sacramento Ballet
 2005 Scottish National Ballet
 2005 Suzanne Farrell Ballet
 2005 Teatro Colón
 2005 Pacific Northwest Ballet
 2006 Chamberlain Ballet
 2006 Hamburg Ballet
 2006 Alberta Ballet
 2006 City Ballet of San Diego
 2006 Dutch National Ballet
 2006 Kirov Ballet
 2006 Pacific Northwest Ballet
 2006 San Francisco Ballet
 2007 Festival Ballet
 2007 Ballet Arizona 
 2007 Los Angeles Ballet
 2007 Paris Opera Ballet
 2007 Royal Ballet, London
 2008 Charleston Ballet Theatre
 2008 Hong Kong Ballet
 2008 Nevada Ballet Theatre
 2008 Los Angeles Ballet 
 2008 National Ballet of Canada 
 2008 Paris Opera Ballet
 2008 Royal Ballet, London
 2008 Suzanne Farrell Ballet 
 2009 Scottish National Ballet 
 2011 Ballet Dortmund
 2011 Semperoper Ballett
 2011 La Scala
 2011 Royal Ballet, London
 2012 Ballet West, Utah
 2012 Bolshoi Ballet, Moscow
 2012 The University of Arizona 
 2013 Royal Ballet, London
 2014 Oklahoma City Ballet
 2014 La Scala
 2014 Boston Ballet
 2014 Pacific Northwest Ballet
 2015 Suzanne Farrell Ballet 
 2015 Het Nationale Ballet, Amsterdam
 2016 The Sarasota Ballet
 2017 Royal Ballet, London 
 2017 Lincoln Center Festival (Paris Opera Ballet, New York City Ballet, and Bolshoi Ballet)
 2018 Bayerisches Staatsballett (Bavarian State Ballet)
 2018 Ballet West, Utah
 2018 Pennsylvania Ballet, Philadelphia 
 2019–2020 Wiener Staatsoper, Vienna
 2022 Miami City Ballet
 2022 Royal Danish Ballet
 2023 Staatsoper, München

Excerpts

Venues

Companies

Quotes 

"It is open to doubt whether even George Balanchine has ever created a work in which the inspiration was so sustained, the invention so imaginative or the concept so magnificent as in the three-act ballet that had its world première at the New York State Theater last night." Clive Barnes

Awards 
In 2008, the Royal Ballet won two Laurence Olivier Awards for their company premiere of Jewels at the Royal Opera House, Covent Garden, featuring new scenic designs by Jean-Marc Puissant, original costume designs by Barbara Karinska, and lighting by Jennifer Tipton. This was the first performance of the full-length ballet by the company, picking up the awards for Best New Dance Production and Outstanding Achievement in Dance. The Olivier Awards are the highest honour in professional British theatre and are equivalent to Broadway's Tony Awards.

Recordings

DVD 
 Balanchine – Jewels by the Paris Opera Ballet (2000). With Aurelie Dupont, Alessio Carbone, Marie-Agnès Gillot, Agnes Letestu, Jean-Guillaume Bart, Clairemarie Osta and Kader Belarbi.
 Choreography by Balanchine by the New York City Ballet (1979). With Suzanne Farrell and Merrill Ashley.
 Jewels by the Mariinsky Ballet (2011). With Irina Golub, Uliana Lopatkina, Igor Zelensky, Andrian Fadeyev, Zhanna Ayupova

Other
In light of the impact of the COVID-19 pandemic on the performing arts, New York City Ballet released recordings of Rubies and Diamond. Rubies featured Megan Fairchild, Gonzalo Garcia and Mira Nadon, and was the latter's debut. Diamond starred Sara Mearns and Russell Janzen. Both Rubies and Diamond are recorded in 2019. The Royal Danish Ballet released a video of Emerald, featuring Amy Watson, Jonathan Chmelensky, Susanne Grinder and Marcin Kupinski.

References

Bibliography 

 Playbill, NYCB, Wednesday, January 2, 2008
 Playbill,  NYCB, Saturday, May 31, 2008
 Playbill, NYCB, Saturday, June 7, 2008
 Repertory Week, NYCB, Winter season, 2008 repertory, week 1
 [https://select.nytimes.com/gst/abstract.html?res=FB0814FB3E5E137A93C5A8178FD85F438685F9 NY Times, Monday, April 17, 1967, by Clive Barnes
 [https://www.nytimes.com/1967/04/23/archives/dance-the-season-grew-rosier.html Sunday NY Times, April 23, 1967, by Clive Barnes
 Sunday NY Times, April 30, 1967, by Richard F. Shepard
 NY Times, Saturday, July 8, 1967, by Don McDonagh

External links 
 Jewels on the website of the Balanchine Trust

1967 ballet premieres
Ballets by George Balanchine
Ballets to the music of Gabriel Fauré
Ballets to the music of Igor Stravinsky
Ballets to the music of Pyotr Ilyich Tchaikovsky
Ballets designed by Barbara Karinska
Ballets designed by Peter Harvey
Ballets designed by Ronald Bates
New York City Ballet repertory